Frank Stout may refer to:
 Frank Stout (rugby union)
 Frank Stout (artist)